Chillicothe is a city in Hardeman County, in the U.S. state of Texas. The population was 707 at the 2010 census.

History

Chillicothe is on U.S. Highway 287, State Highway 91, Farm Road 2006, and the Fort Worth and Denver and Santa Fe railroads in eastern Hardeman County. It was founded in the early 1880s and developed rapidly after the construction of the Fort Worth and Denver City Railway in 1887. The community, named by A. E. Jones for his hometown in Missouri, grew up on Wanderer's Creek near the headquarters of W. H. Worsham's R2 Ranch in the 1870s. The post office was established in 1883 with Charles E. Jones as postmaster. A fire destroyed the town in 1890, and citizens rebuilt south of the rail line rather than north.

Pioneers include Sam L. Crossley, who became the first mayor in 1903, J. J. Britt, J. A. Shires, and W. L. Ledbetter. Wheat elevators were constructed in 1892–1893, and the town was incorporated in 1907 with a population of 800. Additional rail service from the Kansas City, Mexico and Orient Railway began in 1908. Chillicothe is called the Iris Village because of the many irises gracing the town. The population was 1,610 in 1930 and has been declining ever since. Chillicothe has a hospital, a library, a newspaper, and other businesses.

The Chillicothe Hospital officially closed  effective July 22, 2019 after 70 years of service.

Geography

Chillicothe is located in eastern Hardeman County at  (34.255377, –99.512255). U.S. Route 287 runs through the center of town, leading southeast  to Vernon and west  to Quanah, the Hardeman county seat.

Wanderers Creek runs past the west side of the city, flowing north towards the Red River at the Oklahoma state line.

Demographics

2020 census

As of the 2020 United States census, there were 549 people, 266 households, and 214 families residing in the city.

2000 census
As of the census of 2000, there were 798 people, 310 households, and 212 families residing in the city. The population density was 787.3 people per square mile (305.1/km2). There were 373 housing units at an average density of 368.0 per square mile (142.6/km2). The racial makeup of the city was 87.47% White, 5.64% African American, 1.38% Native American, 4.26% from other races, and 1.25% from two or more races. Hispanic or Latino of any race were 10.90% of the population.

There were 310 households, out of which 37.7% had children under the age of 18 living with them, 53.2% were married couples living together, 13.5% had a female householder with no husband present, and 31.6% were non-families. 28.7% of all households were made up of individuals, and 18.1% had someone living alone who was 65 years of age or older. The average household size was 2.57 and the average family size was 3.24.

In the city, the population was spread out, with 31.1% under the age of 18, 6.1% from 18 to 24, 26.2% from 25 to 44, 21.2% from 45 to 64, and 15.4% who were 65 years of age or older. The median age was 35 years. For every 100 females, there were 84.3 males. For every 100 females age 18 and over, there were 75.7 males.

The median income for a household in the city was $25,625, and the median income for a family was $31,250. Males had a median income of $26,645 versus $20,333 for females. The per capita income for the city was $12,450. About 17.0% of families and 16.7% of the population were below the poverty line, including 18.7% of those under age 18 and 13.5% of those age 65 or over.

Education
The city is served by the Chillicothe Independent School District and is home to Chillicothe High School.

Climate
According to the Köppen Climate Classification system, Chillicothe has a semi-arid climate, abbreviated "BSk" on climate maps.

Gallery

Notable people

 James Forehand, responsible for NASA computer systems Apollo missions
 Monroe Parker, college president
 (Hoyt) Clay Puett, born here in 1899, the inventor of Electric Starting Gate
 Herschel Ramsey, professional football player
 Lew Williams, rockabilly singer

References

External links
 Chillicothe ISD

Cities in Texas
Cities in Hardeman County, Texas